Sudono Salim (16 July 1916 – 10 June 2012), also known as Liem Sioe Liong, was a Chinese-born Indonesian banker and businessman. He was the richest individual in Indonesia. He was the founder and chairman of the conglomerate Salim Group before handing over its management to his youngest son Anthoni Salim (now the fifth wealthiest person in Indonesia) in 1992.

Early life
In 1916, Salim was born as Lim Sioe Liong (Lin Shaoliang), in Fuqing, Fujian, China, the second son of a father. According to the Chinese zodiac, he was born in the Year of the Dragon, on the seventh day of the seventh month.

In 1936, he left Fujian to join his brother Lim Ke Lok and brother-in-law Zheng Xusheng in Medan, North Sumatra. Salim diversified their peanut oil trading company into the clove market, which was growing rapidly from demand for production. While in Medan, his manufacturing company supplied soldiers of the Indonesian National Revolution with medical supplies and came into contact with Suharto, an officer of the army. Salim denied allegations that he also provided arms to Indonesian soldiers to resist Dutch forces. As soldiers seized Dutch businesses following independence, his business subsumed many of their assets and gained a monopoly in the clove market, but he denied working with Suharto in expanding his ventures.

Business career

In 1952, after moving to Jakarta, Salim expanded his peanut oil trading company by establishing connections with other Overseas Chinese businessmen in Hong Kong and Singapore respectively. His soap manufacturing company became one of the primary suppliers to the Indonesian National Armed Forces. Salim later expanded his commercial activities into textile manufacturing and financial services, eventually being behind the establishment of Indonesia's largest private bank, Bank Central Asia in 1957. Following the Asian financial crisis, he was forced to give up control of the bank to the government.

In 1968, after a corporate merger, Salim gained the rights to a establish a corporate monopoly on clove importation. He also established Bogasari, a joint venture with another businessman of Hokchia ancestry where the company later became Indonesia's largest miller, producer, and supplier of flour. Windfall profits from those two companies were said to have provided him with the expansion capital to finance the establishment of cement giant Indocement in 1973.

In 1990, he established the food manufacturer Indofood, Indonesia's largest maker of instant noodles.

In 1992, Salim handed over management of the conglomerate Salim Group to his son Anthoni Salim.

By 1997, the Salim Group presided over US$20 billion in assets with more than 500 subsidiaries employing over 200,000 Indonesians. When the Asian Financial Crisis hit, the conglomerate incurred US$4.8 billion in debt and had to give up control of Bank Central Asia in 1998 to the Indonesian government for nationalization. BCA was then 30% owned by two offspring of Suharto.

During the May 1998 riots, Salim fled to Singapore after a mob burned his home in Jakarta; his son remained back in Indonesia to ward off the mobs and resurrected the family business. Salim eventually settled in Los Angeles in the United States. Forbes magazine listed him as the 25th wealthiest businessperson in Southeast Asia in 2004 with a net worth of US$655 million.

Personal life
Salim had three sons and one daughter.

On June 10, 2012, a month before his 96th birthday, Salim passed away from natural causes in Raffles Hospital, Singapore. He is buried at the Lim Chu Kang Cemetery.

References

Bibliography

Further reading

External links
  Sudono Salim at Tokoh Indonesia

1916 births
2012 deaths
Billionaires from Fujian
Businesspeople from Fuzhou
People from Semarang
Businesspeople in the food industry
People from Medan
Businesspeople in manufacturing
Indonesian people of Chinese descent
Businesspeople in retailing
People from Kudus Regency
Businesspeople in shipping
Chinese emigrants to Indonesia
Indonesian bankers
Indonesian billionaires
Indonesian Buddhists
People from Fuqing
Suharto family and associates